"I Ain't Hearin' U" is a song by American recording artist Angie Stone. It was written by Steven "Supe" White, Juanita Wynn, Willie Lester, and Rodney Brown for Stone's fifth studio album Unexpected (2009), while production was helmed by White. Released as the album's lead single, it reached number 14 on Billboards Adult R&B Songs.

Track listings

Personnel
 Rodney Brown – writing
 Tyrrell Harrell – engineering assistance 
 Willie Lester – writing
 Merion "Joei" Powers – recording
 Alvin Speights – mastering, mixing
 Steven "Supe" White – production, writing
 Juanita Wynn – backing vocals, writing

Charts

References

External links
 

2009 songs
2009 singles
Angie Stone songs